Lydia Blume is an American politician from Maine. Blume, a Democrat from York, Maine, has served in the Maine House of Representatives in District 3 since December 2014.

In October 2014, Blume was endorsed by former State Senator Peter Bowman.

References

Year of birth missing (living people)
Living people
People from York, Maine
Democratic Party members of the Maine House of Representatives
Women state legislators in Maine
21st-century American politicians
21st-century American women politicians